Eva Marion "Eve" Rimmer née Davies  (3 April 1937 – 23 November 1996) was a New Zealand Paralympic athlete.  She was born in Whanganui, New Zealand and became one of New Zealand's greatest paraplegic athletes, winning 32 medals – including 22 gold medals – for athletics and swimming at international sporting events.  Growing up in the small rural town of Edgecumbe, Eve was a talented young athlete. As Eve says in her biography "On natural ability alone, I held the school's long jump record for many years".  
This made up for her poor academic credentials. As soon as she was old enough she left school.  
In 1952 at age fifteen, Eve was left paralysed from the waist down when the vehicle she was in crashed on a dark wet night.
This life changing experience did not prevent Eve Rimmer from becoming one of the best athletes in the world. She went on to be a multi-medal winner in shot put, javelin, pentathlon, discus, swimming and archery, In 1973 she received the British Empire Medal. 
 
The same spirit was shown in her personal life. She married Kelvin Stanley (Kel) Rimmer, a radio engineer, and despite being told she would probably never be able to conceive, gave birth to two healthy girls. Eve Rimmer has since been regarded as an inspiration to those with disabilities and able-bodied people. She was actively involved with the paraplegic organisations throughout New Zealand. She gave many paraplegics throughout the world the ability to believe that they could achieve anything they wanted to.

Representations

Eve Rimmer was the first woman selected to represent New Zealand at the Paralympics. She was the only female named along with fourteen men to go to the 1968 Tel Aviv Games and the only one to bring home medals. She continued to represent New Zealand at the games in Heidelberg (1972), Toronto (1976) and Arnhem (1980), winning a total of 14 Paralympic medals, of which 8 were gold. Eve was also very successful in the Commonwealth Paraplegic Games and at domestic competitions.

Achievements
As well as winning many Paralympic and Commonwealth medals, Eve Rimmer has been honoured for her many achievements including being named the Bay of Plenty Sportsperson of the Year in 1992. She was the founder of the Disabilities Resource Centre in Whakatane and was the organiser of the 1990 Games for Disabled in Whakatane, an event which has grown into the Eve Rimmer Games held Easter weekend every two years.
In 1990, Eve was inducted into the New Zealand Sports Hall of Fame due to her domination in paraplegic sport over the years. Rimmer was also runner up for the New Zealand Sportsman of the year title in 1972.  
In the 1973 New Year Honours, Rimmer was awarded the British Empire Medal, for services to paraplegics.
Eve was a very big influence on sports in Whakatane and the Council honoured her by naming a sports ground after her. The Eve Rimmer Park is used for rugby league, netball and bmx.

References

 Disability Resource Centre Trust (2008). "Eve Rimmer". Retrieved 20 March 2008.

External links
 
 

1937 births
1996 deaths
New Zealand female discus throwers
New Zealand female javelin throwers
New Zealand female shot putters
New Zealand female freestyle swimmers
New Zealand female archers
Paralympic athletes of New Zealand
Paralympic archers of New Zealand
Paralympic swimmers of New Zealand
Paralympic gold medalists for New Zealand
Paralympic silver medalists for New Zealand
Paralympic bronze medalists for New Zealand
Paralympic medalists in athletics (track and field)
Paralympic medalists in archery
Paralympic medalists in swimming
Athletes (track and field) at the 1968 Summer Paralympics
Athletes (track and field) at the 1972 Summer Paralympics
Athletes (track and field) at the 1976 Summer Paralympics
Athletes (track and field) at the 1980 Summer Paralympics
Archers at the 1980 Summer Paralympics
Swimmers at the 1968 Summer Paralympics
Medalists at the 1968 Summer Paralympics
Medalists at the 1972 Summer Paralympics
Medalists at the 1976 Summer Paralympics
Medalists at the 1980 Summer Paralympics
Sportspeople from Whakatāne
New Zealand recipients of the British Empire Medal
Wheelchair discus throwers
Wheelchair javelin throwers
Wheelchair shot putters
Paralympic discus throwers
Paralympic javelin throwers
Paralympic shot putters